The 1992–93 European Cup was the 33rd edition of Europe's premier club handball tournament.

Knockout stage

Round 1

|}

Round of 32

	
	

	
	
	

	
	

|}

Round of 16

	

	

	
|}

Quarterfinals

	

|}

Semifinals

|}

Finals

|}

External links
 EHF Champions League website
 European Cup 1993 edition

EHF Champions League seasons
Champions League
Champions League